Lu Bin or Lü Bin may refer to:

Lü Bin (swimmer) (born 1977), female Chinese swimmer
Lu Bin (sprinter) (born 1987), Chinese sprinter
Lü Bin (boxer) (born 1994), Chinese boxer

See also
Lu Bing (born 1944), a Zhuang politician from the People's Republic of China
Lubin (disambiguation)